"Can't Stop This Thing We Started" is a song by Canadian singer-songwriter Bryan Adams. The song was written by Adams and Robert John "Mutt" Lange, and was released as the second single from Adams' sixth studio album, Waking Up the Neighbours (1991), in September 1991. The song peaked at number two on the US Billboard Hot 100 while topping the Canadian RPM Top Singles chart for three non-consecutive weeks. The track received two nominations at the Grammy Awards of 1992 for Best Rock Song and Best Rock Performance, Solo, winning neither. It served as the 2009 British Columbia Liberal Party campaign theme song.

Track listings
7-inch vinyl, cassette: US
A. "Can't Stop This Thing We Started" — 4:29
B. "(Everything I Do) I Do It for You" — 6:38

7-inch single: Europe
A. "Can't Stop This Thing We Started"
B. "It's Only Love" (live)

Maxi-CD: Europe
 "Can't Stop This Thing We Started"
 "It's Only Love" (live)
 "Hearts on Fire" (live)

Charts and certifications

Weekly charts

Year-end charts

Certifications

References

1990 songs
1991 singles
A&M Records singles
Bryan Adams songs
Cashbox number-one singles
RPM Top Singles number-one singles
Song recordings produced by Robert John "Mutt" Lange
Songs written by Bryan Adams
Songs written by Robert John "Mutt" Lange